Santiago González and Scott Lipsky won the first edition of the tournament by defeating Bobby Reynolds and Michael Russell 6–4, 6–3 in the final.

Seeds

Draw

Draw

References
 Main Draw

Dallas Tennis Classic - Doubles
2012 Doubles
Dallas Tennis Classic - Doubles